Stathis Vasiloudis (born 23 February 1996) is a Greek professional footballer who plays as a central midfielder for Super League 2 club Kallithea.

Club career
Coming out of the Panetolikos youth academy, Vasiloudis signed his first professional contract on 3 January 2016.  He made his Superleague Greece debut on 10 January 2016, coming off the bench against Asteras Tripolis.

International career
He made his first appearance with Greece U-21 on 11 November 2016 in a friendly game against Cyprus.

References

External links

1996 births
Living people
Greek footballers
Greece under-21 international footballers
Super League Greece players
Panetolikos F.C. players
Association football forwards
Footballers from Thessaloniki
Kallithea F.C. players
PAE Kerkyra players
Olympiacos Volos F.C. players